WBWP-LD, virtual and UHF digital channel 19, is a low-power television station licensed to West Palm Beach, Florida, United States, which primarily airs paid programming. The station is owned by SagamoreHill Broadcasting. WBWP-LD's transmitter is located on Old Dixie Highway in Lake Park, Florida.

History
The station was founded in 2000; however, it did not begin broadcasting until August 15, 2004.

Subchannels
The station's digital signal is multiplexed:

References

External links

Television channels and stations established in 2000
2000 establishments in Florida
BWP-LD
Independent television stations in the United States
Decades (TV network) affiliates
Movies! affiliates
Heroes & Icons affiliates
Low-power television stations in the United States
SagamoreHill Broadcasting